Gopal Singh Shekhawat, also known as Gopal Singh Idwa is an Indian politician and the former Lok Sabha member, who represented Rajsamand constituency of Rajasthan state as the member of Indian National Congress Party.

Education 
Gopal Sungh has completed his Bachelor of Arts from Jaipur National University in 1971. Later, in 1974, he did his Bachelor of Laws from University of Rajasthan and Secondary education from Board of Secondary Education, Rajasthan in 1966.

Life and background
Gopal Singh, vice-president and party in-charge of Congress Chittorgarh district unit was born on 17 January  1951 in Edwa village of Nagaur district of Rajasthan. He is married to "Ganesh Kanwar" and are blessed with three sons and two daughters. From 2009 - 2014, Singh served as the member of parliament elections held during the 15th Lok Sabha session. He is son of "Narayan Singh" and "Dariao Kanwar", where Dariao Kanwar is the mother of Gopal.

References

1951 births
Rajasthani people
Rajasthani politicians
Living people
Indian politicians